Punkunnam Shiva Temple, located in Punkunnam in Thrissur of Kerala. This temple is a classic example of the Kerala style of architecture. The main deity is Shiva. Parvathy, Ganapathy, Sastha, Nagaraja and Partha Sarathi (Lord Krishna as Charioteer to Arjuna-പാര്‍ത്ഥ സാരഥി) are other sub deities(ഉപദേവത). The Ganeshotsavam is celebrating in grand style. During Sabarimala season the pilgrims are given food free of cost. Near to it is the Poonkunnam Seetha Ramaswamy Temple

See also

Poonkunnam Seetha Ramaswamy Temple
Kuttankulangara Sri Krishna Temple
Temples of Kerala
Poonkunnam Siva Temple

Shiva temples in Kerala
Hindu temples in Thrissur district
108 Shiva Temples